Nationality words link to articles with information on the nation's poetry or literature (for instance, Irish or France).

Events

Works published
 Jan Blahoslav, author and editor, Ivančice hymn-book, a revised edition of the (Protestant) Polish-language Šamotulský kancionál ("Šamotulský hymn-book") 1561, Czech
 Helius Eobanus Hessus, Idyls, German writing in Latin, third revised edition, Frankfort (see also first edition 1509)
 Jan Kochanowski, Chess (Szachy), published either this year or in 1565, Polish

Births

Death years link to the corresponding "[year] in poetry" article:
 February 26 – baptism date of Christopher Marlowe (died 1593), English dramatist and poet
 April 26 – baptism date of William Shakespeare (died 1616), English dramatist and poet (traditional birthdate April 23)
 Date unknown – Henry Reynolds (died 1632), English poet, schoolmaster and literary critic

Deaths
Birth years link to the corresponding "[year] in poetry" article:
 February 18 – Michelangelo (Michelangelo di Lodovico Buonarroti Simoni) (born 1475), Italian painter, sculptor, architect, poet and engineer
 June 17 – Atagi Fuyuyasu (born 1528), Japanese samurai and poet
 Purandara Dasa (born 1484), Hindu composer of Carnatic music and Kannada poetry
 Rupa Goswami (born 1489), Hindu devotional teacher, poet, and philosopher
 Gruffudd Hiraethog (born unknown), Welsh language poet and scholar
 Maurice Sceve, death year uncertain (born c. 1501), French

See also

 Poetry
 16th century in poetry
 16th century in literature
 Dutch Renaissance and Golden Age literature
 Elizabethan literature
 French Renaissance literature
 Renaissance literature
 Spanish Renaissance literature

Notes

16th-century poetry
Poetry